Ivo Wesby (1902–1961), born Ignacy Singer in Kraków, Poland, was a Polish composer and director.  He studied music in Vienna. In the 1920s he was music director of various revi-teaters (revue theaters) in Warsaw, and in the last years before the outbreak of World War II he led the well known Groyse Revie (Big Revue). Wesby was a music director for some famous Polish and Yiddish films including Mamele, Fredek uszczęśliwia świat, Co mój mąż robi w nocy, Serce matki, Moi rodzice rozwodzą się, Gehenna, Rena, and Królowa przedmieścia.

In the Warsaw Ghetto, with Jerzy Jurandot he created a revi-teater in the Polish language, with actors from the Polish stage. He survived the war thanks to a Polish singer Mieczysław Fogg, who hid a family of Wesby, and emigrated to the United States.

References

External links

1902 births
1961 deaths
Jewish cabaret performers
Polish cabaret performers
Polish composers
Jewish composers
Warsaw Ghetto inmates
20th-century composers
20th-century comedians